Thomas Jervoise may refer to:
 Thomas Jervoise (died 1654), English politician, MP for Whitchurch
 Thomas Jervoise (died 1693), English politician, MP for Hampshire (son of the above)
 Thomas Jervoise (died 1743), English politician, MP for Stockbridge, Hampshire, Plympton Erle and Hindon (son of the above)
 Thomas Clarke Jervoise (1764–1809), English politician, MP for Yarmouth